Johnny Horton may refer to:

 Johnny Horton (1925–1960), American country music and rockabilly singer
 Johnny Horton (foosball), American veteran professional Table football player (debuted 1975)
 Griffin (Marvel Comics) (Johnny Horton), a fictional Marvel Comics supervillain